Epermenia aequidentellus, also known as the carrot lance-wing, is a moth of the family Epermeniidae found in Europe, Madeira and the Canary Islands. It was first described by Ernest Hofmann in 1867, from a specimen found in Vorderer Kaiser, near Kufstein, Austria.

Description
The wingspan is 9–12 mm. Adults are on wing from June to July and again from September to October in two generations per year.

The larvae feed on bur-chervil (Anthriscus caucalis), Athamanta cretensis, wild carrot (Daucus carota), baldmoney (Meum athamanticum), Peucedanum species, burnet-saxifrage (Pimpinella saxifraga), villous deadly carrot (Thapsia villosa) and spreading hedgeparsley (Torilis arvensis neglecta). They initially mine the leaves of their host plant. Young larvae make several small, full depth blotch mines. The mines are mostly found in the apical part of the composite leaves. Older larvae live externally on the plant under a slight web, although on host plants with fleshy leaves, the larvae may complete their development within the mine. Larvae can be found from May to June and again from August to September. They are translucent yellowish green with a darker dorsal line and black or brown spots and a black head.

Distribution
It is found from Norway to the Iberian Peninsula, Italy and Greece and from Great Britain and Ireland to Estonia and Romania. It has also been recorded from the Canary Islands and Madeira.

References

Epermeniidae
Leaf miners
Moths described in 1867
Moths of Africa
Moths of Europe
Taxa named by Ernst Hofmann